George Lowther Thompson (1786 – 25 December 1841) was Member of Parliament for Haslemere (1826–1830) and Yarmouth (Isle of Wight) 1830–1831.

His family was associated with Sheriff Hutton Park.

References

External links 
 

1786 births
1841 deaths
Members of the Parliament of the United Kingdom for English constituencies
UK MPs 1820–1826
UK MPs 1826–1830
UK MPs 1830–1831